Charlotte Lake is the second largest freshwater lake in the Chilcotin area of British Columbia, Canada. It is situated southwest of Nimpo Lake. BC Parks maintains a small camp site and boat launch on the southeast end of the lake.

References

Lakes of the Chilcotin
Lakes of British Columbia
Range 3 Coast Land District